Nemone Metaxas (born 3 November 1972 in Chester, Cheshire), often billed simply as Nemone, is an English DJ, radio presenter and television presenter/producer. She is also a trained psychotherapist practising in West and Central London. She is an active sportswoman, participating in triathlons and open water swimming and is a former track and field athlete.

Early life and family 
Nemone's Greek father's maternal ancestral village is in Sykia (Συκέα) and the family name is Anastasakis.

Broadcasting career
After finishing her degree in psychology at the Victoria University of Manchester in 1995, Nemone worked as a research assistant in a psychiatric ward. She went on to become a receptionist at Kiss 102 in Manchester where she learned production and broadcasting skills in her spare time. In 1997, she became the presenter and producer of The Word radio programme as Kiss 105 went on the air. She subsequently presented Galaxy 102 FM's Morning Show, Network Chill Out Show and The Galaxy Chart for Manchester. Having started on reception, she left as anchor of the Morning Show for a job at BBC Radio 1.
 
Nemone joined BBC Radio 1 in October 2000 initially hosting the Saturday breakfast show. She filled in for Jo Whiley's weekday morning show in 2001 while Whiley was on maternity leave. She then took the weekend afternoon slot which she hosted from Autumn 2001 through to the end of 2003. After a revamp of the Radio 1 daytime schedule from early 2004, Nemone replaced Scott Mills on the overnight show (4am7am) broadcasting to audiences in excess of 3 million. She left Radio 1 in September 2005; JK and Joel (Monday-Thursday) and Fearne Cotton and Reggie Yates (Friday) took over her early morning slot.

Nemone joined BBC Radio 6 Music on 3 October 2005, she began presenting the Dream Ticket show as well as filling in on 6 Music's drive time show when Steve Lamacq was away. Nemone took over Vic McGlynn's weekday lunchtime show, weekdays in the 34pm slot on 4 September 2006. She could also be heard covering various shows on BBC Radio 2. Cerys Matthews filled in for her after she began six months maternity leave on 6 July 2009. After Matthews herself went on maternity leave on 24 November, the show was presented by either Chris Hawkins or Andrew Collins. In July 2009, Nemone gave birth to a baby girl and returned to the station on 1 February 2010.

When pregnant with her second child in 2011, Nemone moved from weekdays taking over the weekend breakfast show.  After a short maternity leave she returned, steering it to record RAJAR figures. The requirement to take the show to Media City in Salford meant Nemone passing on the opportunity of returning to Manchester; electing to stay in London where she had established her young family.

In April 2013 Nemone fulfilled a lifelong ambition to curate a specialist dance and electronic music show on BBC Radio 6 Music – Nemone's Electric Ladyland, later The 6 Mix with Nemone. Designing her own show, she has been able to draw on her passion for electronic music, especially championing female DJs, producers and artists like Róisín Murphy, Anna Meredith, Blessed Madonna, Jayda G, Deena Abdelwahed, Maya Jane Coles, Ellen Allien, Sister Bliss, Francesca Lombardo, B Traits, Peggy Gou, Park Hye Jin, Mary Epworth, Laura. 

"The 6 Mix with Nemone" ended in March 2021 and she presented her final show on March 27th 2021.

Nemone's signature musical taste is for quirky vocal samples and wonky beats, alongside funky edged deeper house and techno. She DJs at more leftfield, boutique festivals, recently headlining Soul Circus Yoga Festival in the Cotswolds, alongside DJ Yoda and Fatboy Slim. At Beatherder in Clitheroe she played alongside school friends and former band mates Groove Armada and her pals Utah Saints.  She took Dusky and Luke Solomon to Bestival with her to play for her Electric Ladyland Love Show and Simian Mobile Disco joined her at Green Man Festival.

Nemone has also curated 6 Music Festival Lates gigs over the last decade sharing the decks with Daniel Avery, Rob Da Bank, Richy Ahmed, Hercules and Love Affair’s Andy Butler, Julio Bashmore, Nightwave, Rebecca Vasmant, Soulwax, Erol Alkan, Max Cooper, Breakwave, Norman Jay, DJ Yoda, Kelly Lee Owens. The last 6 Mix with Nemone was broadcast on 27 March 2021.

Nemone has broadcast on BBC Radio 4, appearing on A Good Read and co-hosting Saturday Live with the Reverend Richard Coles. 

Nemone participated with her daughter in the Bumps & Babies Mile in Battersea Park for Sport Relief 2010 along with Denise Van Outen, Carly Cole, Gail Emms, Natasha Kaplinsky and Kim Medcalf.

Psychotherapy career
Always having the intention to build on the psychology degree she gained as an undergraduate in Manchester, Nemone went back to university, studying part-time while broadcasting weekly. Six years later she gained her MA in Psychotherapy and Counselling, earning a distinction in her research project on sibling relationships and sibling death.

Alongside broadcasting and DJing, Nemone is a qualified integrative psychotherapist. She sees clients privately in both Central and West London and increasingly has international clients, whom she sees via videoconferencing. She has been a huge advocate for breathing and grounding exercises; during the COVID pandemic producing her own 15-minute mid-afternoon meditations to help people cope in isolation. She is also a massive proponent of the wellbeing effects of wild swimming having swum herself outdoors in Capri, Menorca, Skopelos, the Oman fjords, West Wittering, and close to home in London.

Television career
Nemone co-hosted the BBC One television programme 101 Ways to Leave a Gameshow alongside Steve Jones. She was seen describing the method of eviction from the game show and then interviewing the losing contestants.

Nemone was one of the contestants on Celebrity Mastermind aired on 20 August 2017 on BBC One. Her specialist subject was the children's books of Roald Dahl, and she came 2nd in the show.

Also, on screen, Nemone has hosted the X Games in Barcelona and Ski Sunday in Livigno for the television show Grandstand.

Musical career
Nemone is an accomplished musician. She was singer and saxophonist in a funk band – other members being Tom Findlay (who went on to form Groove Armada), Andy Spence (from New Young Pony Club), and Perrier Award-winning comedian Dan Antopolski.

Athletic career
Aside from radio and TV broadcasting and psychotherapy work, Nemone is also a keen athlete. Nemone is a former champion 400 metres runner. In 1999 she won the Greater Manchester Championships. In 2000 she qualified for the British Championships and competed in the 400m British Olympic trials.

Nemone decided to bid to run for the Greek Olympic team for the 2004 Summer Olympics. Her training was filmed for the BBC Three television programme My Big Fat Greek Olympic Dream. She has competed in triathlons, most notably finishing in the top 20 amateur women in the 2006 London Triathlon.

She is a keen open water swimmer, having participated in swim treks in Capri, Menorca, the Greek Islands, the Oman fjords as well as the South East of the UK. She has a passion for additional outdoor-based sports, snowboarding and surfing.

Notes

Bibliography 
Honeyball, Lee,"My team : Radio 1 DJ Nemone Metaxas on Sale Harriers Athletics Club", The Observer Sport Monthly, Sunday 3 June 2001

External links
 Nemone's website 

 Nemone on Instagram

1972 births
Living people
English radio DJs
People from Chester
English people of Greek descent
BBC Radio 1 presenters
BBC Radio 2 presenters
BBC Radio 6 Music presenters
Psychotherapists